The Hungaritidae comprises a family of ceratitid ammonites described in the Treatise,(Arkell et al. 1957), as involute compressed, discoidal, with keeled or sharpened venter, smooth to weakly costate. Sutures ceratitid, usually with numerous elements.

Hungaritids are Middle Triassic in age spanning a range from about 247 Ma to 235 Ma. By current assessment six genera are included. 
Hungarites, type genus
Gevanites
Iberites
Negebites
Paraceratitoides
Perrinoceras

Arkell, et al. 1957, in Part L of the original treatise lists instead: Hungarites, Noetlingites, Longobardites,  Neodalmanites, Groenlandites, Perrinoceras, Arctohungarites, Dalmanites, and Prohungarites.  Only two have remained, Hungarites and Perrinoceras.  Longobardites has been removed as type genus for the Longobarditidae, along with Arctohungarites, Groenlandites, and Noetlingites.

References
Arkell, et al., 1957. Mesozoic Ammonoidea, Treatise on Invertebrate Paleontology, Part L. Mollusca 4. Geological Society of America and University of Kansas Press.
Hungaritidae PbDb 12/01/13

Triassic ammonites
Ceratitoidea